Van Serg is a feature on Earth's Moon, a crater in Taurus–Littrow valley.  Astronauts Eugene Cernan and Harrison Schmitt visited it in 1972, on the Apollo 17 mission, during EVA 3.  Van Serg was designated Geology Station 9.

To the northwest is Shakespeare and to the northeast are Cochise and Geology Station 8 at the base of the Sculptured Hills.  To the south is Sherlock, and to the southwest are the Apollo 17 landing site and the large crater Camelot.

Name
The crater was named by the astronauts after Harvard University geology professor Hugh McKinstry, who, according to their explanation, sometimes wrote satire under the pseudonym "Nicholas Van Serg". In fact, McKinstry's pseudonym was Nicholas Vanserg. Songwriter, humorist and academic Tom Lehrer, who attended and taught at Harvard, suggested that McKinstry's pseudonym was inspired by the name of the Vanserg Building at Harvard, which is an  acronym of its original tenants: Veterans Administration, Naval Science, Electronic Research, and Graduate dining hall. Since it was a temporary building, it never got a "real" name. (This wooden building still exists.) A slightly different list of tenants reported is "Veterans Administration, Naval Science, Electronic Research, and Graduate School".

References

External links
43D1S2(25) Apollo 17 Traverses at Lunar and Planetary Institute
Geological Investigation of the Taurus-Littrow Valley: Apollo 17 Landing Site

Impact craters on the Moon
Apollo 17